Rainer Tscharke (born 1 August 1942) is a German former volleyball player who competed for East Germany in the 1968 Summer Olympics and in the 1972 Summer Olympics.

He was born in Babelsberg.

In 1968 he was part of the East German team which finished fourth in the Olympic tournament. He played six matches.

Four years later he won the silver medal with the East German team in the 1972 Olympic tournament. He played four matches.

External links
 
 

1942 births
Living people
German men's volleyball players
Olympic volleyball players of East Germany
Volleyball players at the 1968 Summer Olympics
Volleyball players at the 1972 Summer Olympics
Olympic silver medalists for East Germany
Olympic medalists in volleyball
Medalists at the 1972 Summer Olympics
20th-century German people